John Stehr (born August 20, 1958, Pittsburgh, Pennsylvania), is a former American television journalist. He is currently running for Mayor of Zionsville, Indiana, where municipal elections will be held in 2023.

He retired as full-time lead anchor at NBC affiliate WTHR in Indianapolis, Indiana in December 2018 after nearly 24 years.  He and his wife Amy reside in Zionsville, Indiana, and have five children.  While he is no longer employed as a journalist, Stehr retains the title as WTHR's “Anchor Emeritus”.

Stehr attended Gannon University in Erie, Pennsylvania, and is the only member of his class to receive a "Distinguished Alumni" award. He graduated with a dual-degree (Communications/Political Science) in 1980. His children are named Morgan, Connor, Jeanie, Riley, and Meredith.

Career 
Stehr started his broadcast career at WJET-TV in Erie while still attending Gannon University. After leaving WJET, he went to WSEE-TV, also in Erie.  While at WSEE, he was named solo anchor of the weekday 6 pm and 11 pm newscasts at the age of 21.

From there, he made stops at WOTV (now WOOD-TV) in Grand Rapids, Michigan, WISH-TV in Indianapolis, and KUTV in  Salt Lake City, Utah.

From 1989 to 1991, Stehr anchored the business news for CNBC's The Money Wheel.

In 1991, he became a correspondent at CBS News.  Stehr's reporting focused on personal finance and business issues, appearing primarily on CBS This Morning.  He also anchored the CBS Morning News.

In 2018, Stehr was inducted into the Silver Circle  of the Lower Great Lakes Region of the National Academy of Television Arts and Sciences  for contributions made the broadcasting over at least 25 years.

In December 2018, he was designated a “Sagamore of the Wabash” by Indiana Governor Eric Holcomb — the highest civilian honor bestowed by the state of Indiana.

Stehr was inducted into the Indiana Broadcasters Association Hall of Fame in October 2022.

From CBS News to WTHR
In July 1995, Stehr was hired away from CBS News to become main anchor of WTHR's weeknight newscasts. His work has earned him multiple regional Emmy Awards. During his tenure, WTHR has consistently maintained the top-rated newscasts in the Indianapolis market. The station won the 2011 Edward R. Murrow Award for overall excellence. Stehr announced his retirement on March 28, 2018, but stayed on several extra months due to a co-anchor's illness.

References

External links
 John Stehr Biography

Living people
American reporters and correspondents
Journalists from Pennsylvania
People from Zionsville, Indiana
Television personalities from Pittsburgh
CNBC people
CBS News people
Gannon University alumni
1958 births